Errol Witherden (27 August 1922 – 7 July 2009) was a South African cricketer. He played in seven first-class matches for Border from 1954/55 to 1958/59.

See also
 List of Border representative cricketers

References

External links
 

1922 births
2009 deaths
South African cricketers
Border cricketers
People from Middelburg, Eastern Cape
Cricketers from the Eastern Cape